Scott David Boden (born 19 December 1989) is an English professional footballer who plays as a forward for National League North side Buxton.

Career
Boden was born in Streatham. In 2008, Boden was loaned out from Sheffield United to play five matches for IFK Mariehamn in the Finnish Premier Division. Boden left Åland for England and Chesterfield after his stint at the Mariehamn based club.

In October 2011 Boden moved to Macclesfield Town on a one-month loan.

He was offered a new one-year contract by Chesterfield in May 2012 which Boden accepted.
On 31 January 2013, having struggled to get regular football at Chesterfield, Boden moved on loan to Conference Premier side Alfreton Town until 20 April. After three goals in thirteen appearances Boden was recalled two weeks early following an injury to Marc Richards. He made one further appearance for Chesterfield following his loan, before being released at the end of the season.

On 29 July 2013, following a successful trial period, Boden signed for former club Macclesfield Town on a permanent basis, penning a one-year contract.

Following a successful season which saw Boden score 18 goals for Macclesfield in the Conference Premier he was signed by FC Halifax Town on 1 July 2014.

On 13 July 2015 Boden joined League Two club Newport County on a one-year contract. He made his debut for Newport on 8 August 2015 versus Cambridge United. Boden scored his first competitive goal for Newport on 11 August 2015 versus Wolverhampton Wanderers in the Football League Cup first round. He scored his first league goal for Newport on 15 August 2015 in a League Two match versus Stevenage. On 5 December 2015 Boden scored the only goal in a 1–0 win over Barnet in the FA Cup 2nd round, which saw Newport County make the 3rd round of the FA Cup for the first time since 1986. Boden finished the season as Newport's top scorer with 15 goals in all competitions.

At the end of the 2015–16 season, Boden was offered a new contract by Newport but he chose to move on to Inverness Caledonian Thistle on a three-year deal.
However, Boden was released by Inverness after his first season.

On 6 July 2017, Boden joined Wrexham on a one-year deal. He made his debut on 5 August 2017, against former club Macclesfield Town in a 0–1 home defeat.

He was released by Wrexham on 14 May 2018.

Boden was signed by Gateshead on 20 July 2018.

On 30 January 2019, Boden re-joined former club Chesterfield on an 18-month contract.

On 23 February 2021, Boden joined National League side Torquay United on loan for the remainder of the 2020-21 season.

Boden was released at the end of the 2020–21 season. He subsequently joined fellow National League side Boreham Wood in August 2021 on a one-year deal with the option of a further twelve-months.

On 6 June 2022, Boden joined National League side York City on a permanent move after being released by Boreham Wood.

Career statistics

Honours
Chesterfield
Football League Two: 2010–11
Football League Trophy: 2011–12

References

External links

1989 births
Living people
Footballers from Sheffield
English footballers
English expatriate footballers
Expatriate footballers in Finland
Association football forwards
Sheffield United F.C. players
IFK Mariehamn players
Chesterfield F.C. players
Macclesfield Town F.C. players
Alfreton Town F.C. players
FC Halifax Town players
Newport County A.F.C. players
English Football League players
Inverness Caledonian Thistle F.C. players
Wrexham A.F.C. players
Gateshead F.C. players
Torquay United F.C. players
Boreham Wood F.C. players
York City F.C. players
National League (English football) players
Veikkausliiga players
Scottish Professional Football League players